Joseph Alford Williams (March 3, 1896 – January 18, 1949) was an American football guard. He played college football for Lafayette before turning professional. He played for the Canton Bulldogs during the 1923 NFL season and helped the team to the NFL championship. In 1925, Williams signed with the newly founded New York Giants where he went on to play for two seasons. Following the 1926 season, he was named second-team All-Pro by E.G. Brands of the Collyer's Eye sports journal.

In 1926, he appeared in the film The Quarterback.

References

External links
NFL.com player page

1896 births
1949 deaths
Players of American football from New York City
American football guards
Lafayette Leopards football players
Canton Bulldogs players
New York Giants players